"No Memory" is a song by the English synth-pop duo Scarlet Fantastic, released in September 1987 by Arista Records. The song appears on their 1988 debut album 24 Hours. The song was co-written by Maggie De Monde and Rick P. Jones, and produced by Jones and Daize Washbourn. It reached No. 24 on the UK Singles Chart. The song also reached No. 35 in New Zealand.

Credits and personnel 

 Maggie De Monde – songwriter, vocals
 Rick P. Jones – songwriter, producer
 Daize Washbourn – producer
 Karen Hewitt – engineering
 Pete Hammond – mixing
 Pete Waterman – mixing
 Peter Ashworth – cover art, photographer
 Laurence Stevens – cover art designer

Credits and personnel adopted from the 24 Hours album liner notes.

Charts

Weekly charts

References

External links 

 

1987 songs
1987 singles
Scarlet Fantastic songs
Arista Records singles